Statistics of National Association Foot Ball League in season 1909-10.

League standings

References

1909-10
1909–10 domestic association football leagues
1909–10 in American soccer